Rico Conning is an English record producer, songwriter, sound designer, and guitarist.  In his early career (1977–83) he was a singer, guitarist, and songwriter with London-based band, The Lines. During the 1980s, he worked often at North London's Guerilla Studios, producing and mixing artists such as Adam Ant, Coil, Depeche Mode, Renegade Soundwave, Wire, Swans, Laibach, Étienne Daho, and others. He moved to Los Angeles in the 1990s and formed a successful  sound design company, M62. Around that time he also joined the group Torch Song, whose other members included William Orbit and Laurie Mayer. The first album they made together was Toward the Unknown Region (1994). Rico co-produced Laurie Mayer's album Black Lining (2006). He remastered The Lines' catalogue which was re-released on Acute Records in late 2007. The Lines have released an album Hull Down, on Acute Records 2016.

More recently he has created albums with the French musician, Arnold Turboust. He also has produced Book of Shame's album, Killing Pickle (2018).

Notes

References

External links
 http://www.thelinesonline.com (Unofficial site)
 http://www.coldwarnightlife.com/2020/08/18/shine-on-rico-conning/

British record producers
British sound designers
English songwriters
English rock guitarists
English male guitarists
Living people
Year of birth missing (living people)
British male songwriters